The Communauté de communes Nièvre et Somme is a communauté de communes in the Somme département and in the Hauts-de-France région of France. It was formed on 1 January 2017 by the merger of the former Communauté de communes de l'Ouest d'Amiens and the Communauté de communes du Val de Nièvre et environs. On 1 January 2018 it lost 2 communes to the Communauté d'agglomération Amiens Métropole. It consists of 36 communes, and its seat is in Flixecourt. Its area is 314.2 km2, and its population was 27,972 in 2019.

Composition
The communauté de communes consists of the following 36 communes:

Ailly-sur-Somme
Argœuves
Belloy-sur-Somme
Berteaucourt-les-Dames
Bettencourt-Saint-Ouen
Bouchon
Bourdon
Breilly
Canaples
Cavillon
Crouy-Saint-Pierre
Domart-en-Ponthieu
L'Étoile
Flixecourt
Fourdrinoy
Franqueville
Fransu
Halloy-lès-Pernois
Hangest-sur-Somme
Havernas
La Chaussée-Tirancourt
Lanches-Saint-Hilaire
Le Mesge
Pernois
Picquigny
Ribeaucourt
Saint-Léger-lès-Domart
Saint-Ouen
Saint-Sauveur
Saisseval
Soues
Surcamps
Vauchelles-lès-Domart
Vignacourt
Ville-le-Marclet
Yzeux

References 

Nievre et Somme
Nievre et Somme